Coprinol is an antibiotic isolated from Coprinus.

References

Antibiotics
Phenols